Brown & Gray is a British/American country-pop duo based in London and Los Angeles. The duo is composed of singer/songwriters Kaci Brown and Sam Gray.

History 

Sam and Kaci first started working together as Brown & Gray after Gray wrote a country song, but wasn't satisfied with the vocals. Management at Notting Hill Music brought Brown into the project, and the song developed into what is known today as "Top Down". "Top Down" was released in mid-2017, and was soon featured substantially by Apple Music and Radio Disney Country. Since September 2017, the video for "Top Down" has garnered over 860k views on YouTube. That same month, SiriusXM's country music station, The Highway, named Brown & Gray as a Highway Find Artist.

Brown & Gray also performed a number of shows as part of The Highway Finds Tour: Fall 2017. In early 2018, CMT chose to select Brown & Gray as part of their CMT Discovery Artist program. In April 2018, Brown & Gray performed at Stagecoach in Indio, CA on the SiriusXM Spotlight Stage.

Members 

 Kaci Brown - vocals
 Sam Gray - guitar and vocals

Discography

Singles 

 "Top Down" (2017)
"Top Down (Kue Remix)" (2017)
"It's Not Christmas ('Til You Come Around)" (2017)
"Top Down (Gawler Remix)" (2017)
"Top Down (Nashville Mix)" (2018)
"Top Down (Acoustic)" (2018)

EPs 

 "Salt in the Coffee" (2018)

Music Videos 

 "Top Down" (2017)

References

External links 

 
 https://www.youtube.com/watch?v=PiRpXCUFj28

Musical groups established in 2017
American musical duos
Country music duos
English musical duos